Hymenobacter marinus  is a Gram-negative and non-motile bacterium from the genus of Hymenobacter which has been isolated from coastal seawater from the Sea of Japan on Korea.

References

External links
Type strain of Hymenobacter marinus at BacDive -  the Bacterial Diversity Metadatabase

marinus
Bacteria described in 2016